Jennie is an unincorporated community in Evans County, in the U.S. state of Georgia.

History
The community was named after the Jennie Bradley (née Grice), the daughter of a local merchant and mill owner.

References

Unincorporated communities in Evans County, Georgia